Bob and Mike Bryan were the defending champions, they lost to sixth-seeded Michaël Llodra and Fabrice Santoro in the semifinals.

Unseeded Belgian pair Xavier Malisse and Olivier Rochus defeated Llodra and Santoro, 7–5, 7–5 to win the men's doubles title.

Seeds

Draw

Finals

Top half

Section 1

Section 2

Bottom half

Section 3

Section 4

External links
Association of Tennis Professionals (ATP) – main draw
2004 French Open – Men's draws and results at the International Tennis Federation

Men's Doubles
French Open by year – Men's doubles
French Open